Zakarie Labidi (born 8 February 1995) is a French footballer who currently plays for AS Beauvais Oise.

Club career
Labidi is a youth exponent from Lyon. He made his Ligue 1 debut on 21 February 2016 against Lille replacing Jordan Ferri after 84 minutes in a 1–0 away loss.

On 27 July 2016, Labidi signed a one-year contract with Brest.

International career
Labidi was born in France, and is of Tunisian and Algerian descent. He is a youth international for France.

Career statistics

References

External links
 

1995 births
Living people
French footballers
French expatriate footballers
Association football midfielders
Association football wingers
France youth international footballers
French sportspeople of Tunisian descent
French sportspeople of Algerian descent
Ligue 1 players
Ligue 2 players
Championnat National 2 players
Championnat National 3 players
Swiss Promotion League players
Olympique Lyonnais players
Stade Brestois 29 players
Club Africain players
FC Stade Nyonnais players
AS Beauvais Oise players
French expatriate sportspeople in Switzerland
Expatriate footballers in Switzerland